Pecetto may refer to two places in the north-west Italian region Piedmont:
Pecetto Torinese, in the Province of Turin
Pecetto di Valenza, in the Province of Alessandria